P. Chandrakumar is an Indian film director, cinematographer, and film distributor who worked in Malayalam cinema.

Early life
Chandrakumar hails from Kollengode, Palakkad district in Kerala, India. He has a younger brother P. Sukumar. He was schooled at Rajas School in Kollengode. P. Kunhiraman Nair taught at the school during the time. His father, Kumaran Nair worked in the Police department and also as a visha vaidyan (venom doctor). After his father received transfer to Parambikulam, Chandrakumar took the job as a visha vaidyan when he was yet to turn 14 years. He also learned and used to perform Kathakali in front of tourists in the Kollengode Palace. Vasu Menon, the founder of Vasu Films company and Vasu Studio once received treatment from him for snake bite. Vasu identified Chandrakaumar as the Kathakali performer he saw at the Kollengode Palace and invited him to film industry. It was a turning point in his life.

Career
At the age of 14, he began his film career as an assistant director in P. Bhaskaran-directed Ummachu (1971). It was on the sets of Ummachu he met Madhu, who would later produce six films and act in 29 films directed by Chandrakumar. After Ummachu, he worked under 13 directors. He debuted as a director at the age of 19 with the 1977 black and white film Manassoru Mayil which was a moderate box office success. His second film Jala Tharangam (1978) starring Madhu also performed moderately. His third film was the first production of Madhu's Uma Studio, which was a major commercial success. Anubhoothikalude Nimisham was also a major commercial success. In 1980s, he founded a company for distributing English films. In 1988, he directed Adipapam, an erotic film based on the bible, which became one of the highest-grossing Malayalam films of all time. It is regarded as the first superhit softporn film in Malayalam cinema. The success of the film kick started a trend of softporn films in Malayalam cinema for a while.

Personal life
He is married to doctor Jayanthi and the couple has two children—Kiran Kumar and Karishma. His younger brother P. Sukumar is a popular cinematographer, actor and film director in Malayalam.

Filmography

References

External links

Living people
Film directors from Kerala
Malayalam film directors
20th-century Indian film directors
1954 births